The 2000 IIHF Women's World Championships was held April 3–9, 2000 in the Ontario towns of Mississauga, Barrie, Kitchener, London, Niagara Falls, Oshawa and Peterborough, Canada. Final games were played at the Hershey Centre in Mississauga.  Team Canada won their sixth consecutive gold medal at the World Championships defeating the United States.

In one of the closest finals competed, Canada took the tournament with a 2–1 final win, in overtime.  Finland picked up their sixth consecutive bronze medal, with a win over Sweden.

This year's tournament also counted as qualification for the Salt Lake Olympics.  With six automatic berths available, all four semi-finalists were assured Olympic participation.  In the consolation round China defeated Germany and Russia defeated Japan, to join them.

Teams

With the promotion and relegation format now in use, the top seven nations were joined by Japan, the winner of Group B in 1999.

Venue

World Championship Group A

The eight participating teams were divided up into two seeded groups as below. The teams played each other once in a single round robin format. The top two teams from the group proceeded to the Final Round, while the remaining teams played in the Consolation Round.

First round

Group A

Standings

Results
All times local

Group B

Standings

Results
All times local

Playoff round

Consolation round 5–8 place

Consolation round 7–8 place

Consolation round 5–6 place

Final round

Semifinals

Match for third place

Final

Champions

Scoring leaders

Goaltending leaders

Final standings

World Championship Group B

World Championship Group B was played again with an eight team tournament which was hosted by Latvia in Liepāja and Riga.  won the tournament winning the final stage round robin by 3 points to win the competition and to ensure their Promotion to the main World Championship in 2001.

Directorate Awards
Goalie: Sami Jo Small, (Canada)
Defender: Angela Ruggiero, (United States)
Forward: Katja Riipi, (Finland)

References

External links
 Summary from the Women's Hockey Net
 Detailed summary from passionhockey.com
 Official IIHF page for the tournament

 
International ice hockey competitions hosted by Canada
World
IIHF Women's World Ice Hockey Championships
Ice hockey competitions in Ontario
April 2000 sports events in Canada
Women's ice hockey competitions in Canada
2000 in Ontario
Sport in Mississauga
Sport in Kitchener, Ontario
Sports competitions in London, Ontario
Sport in Niagara Falls, Ontario
Sport in Oshawa
Sport in Peterborough, Ontario